The parent article is at List of University of Michigan alumni.

This is a list of business alumni from the University of Michigan.

Advertising and marketing
Leo Burnett (BA 1914), journalism, advertising pioneer; founded the Leo Burnett Company in 1935 with $50,000 of borrowed money
Utpal Dholakia, (Ph.D. 1998), researcher and professor
Patrick LaForge, President and CEO of the Edmonton Oilers

Billionaires
J. Robert Beyster (COE: BSE, MS, Ph.D.), chairman, president, and CEO of Science Applications International Corporation
Kenneth B. Dart (COE: BSE 1976), businessman and Caymanian billionaire
William Davidson (BUS: BBA 1947), finance and entertainment; founder of the William Davidson Institute at the Ross School of Business; his son Ethan, a Michigan graduate, inherits control of his foundation
Bharat Desai (BUS: MBA 1981), co-founder, president, and CEO of Syntel; Indian billionaire
Stanley Druckenmiller (MDNG: Ph.D., Econometrics), formerly worked with George Soros; co-founded Duquesne Capital
Henry Engelhardt (B.A.), founder and Chief Executive of Admiral Group, a British motor insurance company; English billionaire
Brad Keywell (BUS: BBA 1991; LAW: JD 1993), co-founder and principal of Groupon
Bobby Kotick, businessman; president and CEO of Activision Blizzard, a member of the S&P 500
Eric Paul Lefkofsky (BA, J.D. 1993), serial entrepreneur; angel investor in Groupon; on Forbes 2011 list of billionaires
Doug Meijer (BS), net worth of $4.2 billion; son of Frederik G. H. Meijer
Hank Meijer (BA Literature 1973), net worth of $4.2 billion; oldest son of Frederik G. H. Meijer
Tom S. Monaghan (MDNG), founder and former owner of Domino's Pizza
Charlie Munger (MDNG), Vice Chairman of Berkshire Hathaway; donated in excess of $25 million for library and Lawyers Club renovations and $110 million for graduate housing and graduate fellowships
Larry Page (COE: BSE 1995), co-founder of Google
Jorge M. Perez (M.U.P 1976), real estate developer
Stephen M. Ross (BUS: BBA 1962), real estate developer; donated $100 million to the Ross School of Business, named in his honor in 2004; donated $200 million in 2013, split evenly between the Ross School of Business and Athletics Department, making him the largest donor in Michigan's history
Dr. Homer Stryker (MED: M.D. 1925; D. 1980), founder of medical device company Stryker Corporation
A. Alfred Taubman (MDNG: HLLD 1948), founder of the Taubman Company; his cumulative lifetime donations total roughly $141 million, making him the second largest donor in Michigan's history
Preston Robert (Bob) Tisch (A.B. 1948), chairman of the Loews Corporation; United States Postmaster General (1986–88); former owner of 50% of the New York Giants; his wife, Joan Tisch (UM graduate, AB 1948) has replaced him on the Forbes 400 list
Bruce Wasserstein (AB), mergers and acquisitions specialist
Ralph Wilson was as an American businessman and sports executive. He was best known as the founder and owner of the Buffalo Bills, a team in the National Football League (NFL). 
Sam Wyly (BUS: MBA 1957), serial entrepreneur; owner of the Bonanza Restaurants chain
Samuel Zell (LAW: AB 1963, JD 1966), real estate developer; founder of EQ Office; former chairman of the National Association of Real Estate Investment Trusts
Niklas Zennström (MDNG), sold his share of internet telephony company Skype to eBay

Entrepreneurs
Dave Barger, President and Chief Operating Officer of JetBlue; CEO as of 2007
Steve Blank (MDNG), serial entrepreneur, founder and/or part of eight Silicon Valley startups
Henry W. Bloch (BS 1944), co-founder and former president of H&R Block Inc.
Louis Borders (BA 1969), co-founded Borders with brother Tom (MA 1966)
Edward Conard (BSE 1978), founding partner at Bain Capital
Donald N. Frey (BS MTL 1947, MSE 1949, PhD 1951, D. Eng. hon. 1967), chairman and CEO of Bell & Howell for 17 years; received the National Medal of Technology in 1990
Jacques Habra
James John (J.J.) Hagerman (1857, industrialist who owned mines, railroads and corporate farms in the American West in the late 19th century and early 20th century; one of the most influential men in territorial New Mexico
Gerrard Wendell "(G.W.)" Haworth (COE: MA), founding chairman of Haworth, Inc., a manufacturer of office environments that grew from a garage-shop venture in 1948 to a $1.4 billion global corporation
Andrew Heiberger, founder, owner, and CEO of Buttonwood Development and Town Residential
Elle Kaplan (BA), founder and CEO of LexION Capital Management
Gregg Kaplan (AB), president and chief operating officer of change-sorting company Coinstar, which now owns Redbox
Brad Keywell (BUS: BBA 1991; LAW: JD 1993), serial entrepreneur
John Koza (MA Mathematics 1966; BA 1964, MS 1966, Ph. D 1972 Computer Science), venture capitalist; consulting professor in the department of electrical engineering at Stanford University; co-founder of Scientific Games Corporation, where he co-invented the scratch-off instant lottery ticket
Mark Pieloch, pet pharmaceuticals 
Benjamin D. Pritchard (LAW: JD), American Civil War general who captured Jefferson Davis; State Treasurer of Michigan (1880-1884); organizer and first president (1870–1905) of the First National Bank of Allegan; founded the First State Bank, which was the first bank in the county to be designated as a state depository, the first savings bank, and the first bank to install safety deposit boxes
Robert J. Vlasic, CEO and popularizer of Vlasic Pickles
Charles Rudolph Walgreen Jr. (PHC 1928, HMS 1951, HLHD 1992), son of the founder of Walgreens drugstores; took over the company presidency in 1939 at age 33; steered the company through World War II and the post-war boom; in 2005, in acknowledgment of his $10 million donation, the university named its new facility the Charles R. Walgreen Jr. Drama Center
Gary Wiren (MSc), founder of Golf Around the World and inventor of the Impact Bag

Hospitality and travel industries
Ralph Bahna (BA 1964), CEO of Cunard Line (1980–1989); Chairman of Priceline.com (2004–2013); founder of Club Quarters

Industrials
Robert Beverley Evans, automobile industry executive, founder of Evans Industries; chairman of American Motors Corporation
Edgar N. Gott, co-founder and first president of The Boeing Company; executive at Consolidated Aircraft
Mark N. Greene (MA, Ph.D in economics), CEO and member of the board of FICO (Fair Isaac Corporation) since 2007
James P. Hoffa (LAW: LLB 1966), attorney; son of Jimmy Hoffa; president of the International Brotherhood of Teamsters since 1999
C. Robert Kidder (COE: BS IE 1967), CEO of Borden Chemical 1995-2002; Principal, Stonehenge Partners, Inc., since 2004; appointed chairman of the restructured Chrysler Group LLC in 2009; former lead director of Morgan Stanley; ran 3Stone Advisors, a Columbus, Ohio, investment firm focusing on clean technology start-ups
Temel Kotil (COE: MA 1986, MA 1987, PH.D. 1991), CEO of Turkish Airlines
Jerry W. Levin (B.S.E), businessman
Timothy M. Manganello (BSME 1972, MSME 1975), CEO of BorgWarner; member of the Board of BorgWarner (2002-, as Chairman, 2003-)
William J. Olcott, president of the Oliver Iron Mining Company 1909-1928; president of the Duluth, Missabe and Iron Range Railway 1901-1909
Thomas F. Olin (BA Economics 1952), chairman and co-CEO of Archway Cookies; worked in clandestine service for the CIA
Mervin Pregulman, played for the Wolverines (1941–43) and in the NFL with the Green Bay Packers (1946), Detroit Lions (1947–48), and New York Bulldogs (1949); went on to a successful business career as president and CEO of Siskin Steel & Supply Co. in Chattanooga, Tennessee 
Frederic L. Smith (1890); co-founder of the Olds Motor Works in 1899; co-founder of General Motors Corporation in 1908
Louis Carlyle Walker (BA 1896), industrialist, philanthropist, political figure; co-founded the Shaw-Walker Company in 1899 and became sole owner in 1902; important figure in history of Muskegon, Michigan benefactor and namesake of the L. C. Walker Arena
Thomas J. Wilson (BS 1970), Chairman and CEO of Allstate Insurance, Incorporated

Internet, software, and hardware
Jason Blessing, CEO of Model N (company)
Jim Buckmaster, CEO of Craigslist
Dick Costolo (BA), former CEO of Twitter
Dean Drako (COE), serial entrepreneur; has started more than five companies; founder, president and CEO of Barracuda Networks
Kevin O'Connor (COE: BSE EE 1983), co-founder and CEO of DoubleClick Inc.

Mergers, acquisitions, and turn-arounds
David A. Brandon (AB 1974), Chairman and CEO of Domino's Pizza
Ronald L. Olson (JD: Law 1966), name partner at Munger Tolles & Olson; RAND Corporation Chairman, Board of Trustees (former); member of the board of Munger, Tolles & Olson Chairman; member of the board of Berkshire Hathaway (1997-); Council on Foreign Relations board of directors
Bruce Wasserstein (AB 1967), CEO of Lazard Freres, founder of Wasserstein Perella & Co.

Finance
Jason DeYonker, founder and Managing Partner of Forté Capital Advisors, a private equity firm; board member of Academi, formerly known as Blackwater
David S. Evans (BGS), Chairman and Chief Investment Office of Glencoe Capital
Paul Kangas, figure on Nightly Business Report on PBS (1979–2009; anchor 1990-2009)
Charles Edward Merrill (attended Law School from 1906-07 but did not graduate), co-founder of Merrill Lynch
Scott Seligman, real estate developer, the founder of the Sterling Bank and Trust, and minority owner of the San Francisco Giants major league baseball team
Boaz Weinstein (BA 1995), derivatives trader and hedge fund manager; formed Saba Capital Management

Not-for-profit
Dale Carlson (SPH: MA), first chief communications officer for the California Institute for Regenerative Medicine
Simeon Djankov (PhD), Deputy Prime Minister and Minister of Finance of Bulgaria
Raynard S. Kington (B.S.; SOM: M.D.), President of Grinnell College; former Principal Deputy Director of the National Institutes of Health (2003–10), briefly served as acting director of NIH (2008–09); elected to the Institute of Medicine in 2006
William Andrew Paton, first editor of The Accounting Review

Real estate
Amy Rose Silverman (B.S.), real estate developer and Co-President of Rose Associates

References

External links
University of Michigan Alumni

University of Michigan business alumni
Business